Lee Ga-hyun (born Kwak Ga-hyun on May 18, 1988) is a South Korean actress.

Filmography

Television series

Film

References

External links
Lee Ga-hyun at Daum 

South Korean television actresses
South Korean television personalities
Living people
1988 births
People from Gangneung
Dongguk University alumni
21st-century South Korean actresses
Miss Korea delegates